The rough ridged frog (Ptychadena bunoderma) is a species of frog in the family Ptychadenidae. It is found in Angola, Zambia, and possibly Democratic Republic of the Congo. Its natural habitats are moist savanna and subtropical or tropical seasonally wet or flooded lowland grassland.

References

Ptychadena
Amphibians described in 1907
Taxonomy articles created by Polbot